Raquel Willis (born 1990/1991) is an African American writer, editor, and transgender rights activist. She is a former national organizer for the Transgender Law Center, the former executive editor of Out magazine, and currently serves as the Director of Communications for the Ms. Foundation for Women. In 2020, Willis won the GLAAD Media Award for Outstanding Magazine Article.

Early life and education
Willis was born and raised in Augusta, Georgia. She grew up in a Catholic family that encouraged volunteerism, stewardship, and giving back to the community.  Her parents were both Sunday school teachers, and she attended church every weekend.

As a child, Willis "was very conflicted" over her gender and sexuality. She was bullied at school and by kids in the neighborhood. As a teenager, she came out as gay, and eventually found acceptance from her peers and parents.

Willis attended college at the University of Georgia, where she encountered more harassment for being gender non-conforming. She came to realize that she was a trans woman, and decided to transition.  She worked with other students to counter discrimination based on gender identity. Willis graduated in 2013 with a bachelor's degree in journalism.

Activism and career
Following graduation from UGA, Willis moved to Atlanta and began getting involved in activism with fellow transgender and gender non-conforming people of color. She later came to live in Oakland and work as a communications associate, then national organizer, for the Transgender Law Center.

Willis was one of the speakers at the 2017 Women's March in Washington, D.C. She later stated that though she was glad to be there, she felt that trans women were an "afterthought in the initial planning", and she was cut off by organizers when she tried to say this at the demonstration itself.

Willis has spoken out strongly on behalf of trans women, criticizing comments by Chimamanda Ngozi Adichie that differentiated transgender women from cisgender women, and calling for a boycott of The Breakfast Club radio show after comedian Lil Duval joked about killing trans women during an interview.

Willis designed the Black Trans Flag, a variation on the Transgender Pride Flag with a black instead of white stripe across the middle.

Willis' writings have appeared in publications including The Huffington Post, BuzzFeed, and Autostraddle. She also hosted The BGD Podcast with Raquel Willis.

In December 2018, Willis was appointed as executive editor of Out magazine, becoming the first trans woman to lead the publication.

Willis, along with Neal Broverman, endorsed Elizabeth Warren in the 2020 Democratic Party presidential primaries.

In June 2020, Willis was announced as the new Director of Communications for the Ms. Foundation for Women.

Work
 2017 – Sojourner Truth Transformational Leadership Fellow
 2018 – Jack Jones Literary Arts Sylvia Rivera Fellow
 2018 – Open Society Foundations Soros Equality Fellow
 2019 – The Trans Obituaries Project

Awards and recognition
 2017 – Essence Woke 100 Women
 2017 – The Root 100 Most Influential African Americans
 2018 – San Francisco Transgender Day of Visibility Emerging Leader Award
 2018 – Frederick Douglass 200 awardee
 2020 – GLAAD Media Award for Outstanding Magazine Article
2021 — Fast Company Queer 50

References

External links

 

1990s births
21st-century American non-fiction writers
21st-century American women writers
African-American women writers
African-American writers
American podcasters
BuzzFeed people
Flag designers
HuffPost writers and columnists
LGBT African Americans
LGBT people from California
LGBT people from Georgia (U.S. state)
Living people
Transgender women
Transgender rights activists
University of Georgia alumni
Writers from Augusta, Georgia
Writers from Oakland, California
American women non-fiction writers
American women columnists
American women podcasters